Rancho Conejo Playfields is a  multi-use community park in Newbury Park, California, adjacent to Conejo Canyons Open Space and the Arroyo Conejo Nature Preserve which includes  of public open-space land and numerous trails in the western Simi Hills.

Recreation
The park contains softball fields, soccer fields, tennis courts, a basketball court, turf, playground- and picnic areas.   It was dedicated in 1997 to the Conejo Recreation and Park District by the Rancho Conejo subdivision's developer, Shapell Industries.

Hiking
Rancho Conejo Playfields is home to the primary trailhead for the Arroyo Conejo Trail in the western Simi Hills, which has junctions with various hiking trails following Arroyo Conejo into La Branca and Hill Canyon, the Arroyo Conejo Nature Preserve, Santa Rosa Valley County Park, and Mount Clef Ridge and Wildwood Regional Park in Thousand Oaks. The trails are utilized for hiking, horseback-riding, and mountain biking.

See also

References

Parks in Ventura County, California
Conejo Valley
Newbury Park, California
Simi Hills
Sports in Thousand Oaks, California
Sports venues in Ventura County, California
Protected areas established in 1977
1977 establishments in California